The Super 1750 Clone was a 512 kB RAM expansion unit designed as a tiny, but compatible, third-party replacement for Commodore's then out-of-production CBM 1750 REU.  Manufactured by Chip Level Designs, the Super 1750 Clone was sold by Software Support International.

 Used the same MOS 8726 REC (RAM Expansion Controller) chip as the Commodore REUs.
 Worked on the C128 and the C64.
 Rather than 16 chips of 256K×1-bit DRAMs, it used four 256K×4-bit DRAMs (in ZIP packages).  This gave several advantages over Commodore's original REUs:
 Less power consumption, so did not require the C64 to be upgraded with a heavy-duty power supply to use it.
 Much smaller; the plastic case was the same type used by the Epyx FastLoad cartridge.

External links 
c64.org: Super 1750 Clone User's Guide (text) 
c64.org: Super 1750 Clone User's Guide (zip file) (eText)

Computer hardware clones
Memory expansion
Home computer peripherals
Commodore 64